Busch Stadium (also referred to informally as "New Busch Stadium" or "Busch Stadium III") is a baseball stadium located in St. Louis, Missouri. The stadium serves as the home of the St. Louis Cardinals, the city's Major League Baseball (MLB) franchise, and has a seating capacity of 44,494, with 3,706 club seats and 61 luxury suites. It replaced Busch Memorial Stadium (aka Busch Stadium II) and occupies a portion of that stadium's former footprint. A commercial area dubbed Ballpark Village was built adjacent to the stadium over the remainder of the former stadium's footprint.

The stadium opened on April 4, 2006 with an exhibition between the minor league Memphis Redbirds and Springfield Cardinals (both affiliates of the St. Louis Cardinals), which Springfield won 5–3 with right-hander Mike Parisi recording the first win. The first official major league game occurred on April 10, 2006, as the Cardinals defeated the Milwaukee Brewers 6–4 behind an Albert Pujols home run and winning pitcher Mark Mulder.

In 2004, then-Anheuser-Busch president August Busch IV announced that the brewing giant had purchased 20-year naming rights for the stadium. Team owner William DeWitt Jr. said: "From the day we began planning for the new ballpark, we wanted to keep the name 'Busch Stadium.' August Busch IV and Anheuser-Busch share our vision for continuing that tradition for our great fans and the entire St. Louis community."

It is the third stadium in St. Louis to carry the name Busch Stadium. Sportsman's Park was renamed Busch Stadium in 1953; then-team owner August Busch Jr. had planned to name it Budweiser Stadium, but at the time league rules prohibited naming a venue after an alcoholic beverage. Busch named the stadium after himself, and the Anheuser-Busch corporation later introduced "Busch Beer". The first Busch Stadium closed in 1966 and both the baseball Cardinals, and the National Football League (NFL)'s team of the same name (now the Arizona Cardinals) moved to a new multi-purpose stadium, named Busch Memorial Stadium (Busch Stadium II).

History

Planning

In 1995, St. Louis Cardinals team ownership began to lobby for a new ballpark in downtown St. Louis, but the team was unable to acquire funding for the project for several years. In June 2001, the Missouri state government signed a contract with the team, proposing a ballpark in downtown St. Louis, but a subsequent funding bill was struck down in May 2002, leaving the saga open.  Team owners sought a location near Madison, Illinois, adjacent to Gateway International Raceway, until the city of St. Louis drafted a financing plan for the team to construct the new stadium in downtown St. Louis.  The stadium was financed through private bonds, bank loans, a long-term loan from St. Louis County, and money from the team owners. The development, including the Ballpark Village was projected to cost approximately $665 million with the stadium alone costing $365 million.

Construction and opening
 
New Busch Stadium was designed by Populous (then known as HOK Sport) and built by Hunt Construction with an estimated cost of $344.8 million, which proved too low by $20.2 million to its final cost of $365 million. Populous' senior project designer for Busch Stadium was Jim Chibnall, who was also the lead designer of Progressive Field in Cleveland, Heinz Field in Pittsburgh, Sydney Olympic Stadium, and other notable stadiums throughout the world.

The field level (16,880 seats), terrace level (9,150), and bleachers (3,661) were completed in time for opening day, with total capacity on that day of 37,962, not including up to 2,751 standing room tickets.

Construction on the seating area was completed in late May increasing the capacity for the May 29, 2006 game vs the Houston Astros with finishing touches performed throughout the year. Including all 2,886 standing-room-only tickets for the general public, as well as suites and party rooms, the stadium's total capacity is 46,861. Natural grass turf was installed in March 2006.

Notable baseball events
In the stadium's debut season every Cardinal game was sold out, giving a total attendance of 3,407,104 for the season, the second-largest in team history, but since surpassed in both 2007, 2008, and 2014–2017.

The largest attendance for a baseball game occurred August 6, 2022, when 48,581 fans watched a game between the Cardinals and the New York Yankees, a 1-0 Cardinals victory.

Playoffs

2006
In the first season of the new stadium, the Cardinals hosted the San Diego Padres in Games 3 and 4 of the National League Division Series. In Game 3 on October 7, San Diego defeated St. Louis 3–1. The Cardinals won the next night by the score of 6–2, clinching the series win. In the 2006 National League Championship Series the Cardinals hosted the New York Mets in Games 3, 4, and 5. St. Louis won Game 3 and Game 5, and eventually clinched their 17th National League pennant by defeating the Mets on the road in Game 7, 3–1.

The Cardinals faced the Detroit Tigers in the 2006 World Series. This was the third meeting between the two ballclubs in the Fall Classic, and the first in 38 years. The Cardinals won the first in 1934, and the Tigers won the second in 1968; each went the full seven games. Because the American League won that year's All-Star Game, the Tigers were granted home field advantage, meaning the Cardinals would host Games 3, 4, and 5. This proved fortuitous for St. Louis, as they won every game at home, clinching their 10th World Series championship in Game 5 on October 27, by the score of 4–2.

2009
Busch Stadium hosted only one postseason game in 2009, a 5–1 loss versus the Los Angeles Dodgers on October 10, to complete a sweep of the Cardinals.

2011
In 2011, Busch Stadium hosted two postseason games in the National League Division Series versus the Philadelphia Phillies. On October 4, the Phillies won 3–2, to take a 2–1 game lead over the Cardinals. The next night, the 5th, the Cardinals beat the Phillies 5–3 to tie the series at 2 games apiece. In the NLCS versus the Milwaukee Brewers, the Cardinals won 2 of the three games they played at home (Games 3, 4, 5). The Cards ended up winning the series on the road in Milwaukee to advance to the World Series. (This was the second time the Cardinals had defeated the Brewers in a postseason series, the first being the 1982 World Series, when Milwaukee was represented as an American League team; the Brewers switched over to the National League in 1998.)

Because the National League had won the 2011 MLB All-Star Game, home field advantage went to the Cardinals as the National League champions, thus allowing the team to host the Texas Rangers for Games 1, 2, 6 and 7. Game 1 was won by the Cardinals on October 19, along with Game 6 on October 27, in a game won in walk-off fashion by a David Freese home run, then the deciding Game 7, which was taken by the Cardinals in a 6–2 final, giving the team the 2011 World Series title.

2012
Busch Stadium hosted two postseason games vs. the Washington Nationals in the 2012 National League Division Series. The two teams split the two games at Busch, before the Cardinals won two of the next three games at Nationals Park. The Cardinals then won the first two home games against the San Francisco Giants to take a 3–1 series lead, but lost Game 5 and went on to lose the series in Game 7 at AT&T Park.

2013
The Cardinals hosted nine postseason games at Busch Stadium in 2013. In the National League Division Series, they won Games 1 and 5 against the Pittsburgh Pirates, with the latter game capping off a series comeback after trailing 2–1. They would win every home game of the NLCS against the Dodgers, including a 9–0 shutout win in Game 6 to take the series 4–2. In the World Series, the Cardinals hosted Games 3–5 against the Boston Red Sox. Game 3 on October 26 ended in an obstruction call when Allen Craig was impeded by Will Middlebrooks at third base, thus awarding him a run after umpire Jim Joyce ruled obstruction on the play. The next night Game 4 ended on a successful pickoff by Koji Uehara on pinch-runner Kolten Wong at first base. The Cardinals led 2–1 after the controversial Game 3 win, but proceeded to lose the next three games to lose the series 4–2.

2014
The Cardinals played two games in Busch Stadium against the Los Angeles Dodgers in the National League Division Series. The first two games of the Series were played at Dodger Stadium in Los Angeles, and the teams each won a game there. The Series then moved to Busch Stadium, and the Cardinals won the next two games, to win the Series 3-1 and advance to the National League Championship Series.

The Cardinals opened the National League Championship Series at Busch Stadium on October 11, 2014, against the San Francisco Giants.  The teams split games 1 and 2 played at Busch Stadium, and the Series moved to AT&T Park in San Francisco. The Giants won games 3, 4, and 5 in their home ballpark, to defeat the Cardinals in the NLCS 4–1, and move on to an appearance in the 2014 World Series against the Kansas City Royals.

2015
The Cardinals hosted two postseason games at Busch Stadium in 2015. In the National League Division Series, they won game 1 on October 9, 2015, but lost game 2 against the Chicago Cubs. The Cardinals then lost games 3 and 4 to the Cubs at Wrigley Field to lose the series 3–1.

2019
The Cardinals hosted four postseason games at Busch Stadium in 2019, in the National League Division Series against the Atlanta Braves, and in the National League Championship Series against the Washington Nationals.

MLB All-Star Game
The stadium hosted the 2009 Major League Baseball All-Star Game on July 14, 2009. The American League defeated the National League in that game, 4–3. Tampa Bay Rays outfielder Carl Crawford won MVP. President Barack Obama threw out the ceremonial first pitch wearing a Chicago White Sox jacket.

College and high school baseball
Missouri has recently started to play one game a year at Busch. In 2009, they defeated SLU, and in 2010, they defeated Illinois in a Braggin' Rights matchup.

The Cardinals have allowed local high school teams to play each other on the field following select weekend afternoon games. So far, only 3 homeruns have been hit by high school students. The first was on May 7, 2011, by Johnny Wilson of Marquette Catholic High School against Farmington High School. The second was on April 11, 2018, by Zach Hilboldt of De Smet Jesuit High school against Palmyra High School. The third was on April 21, 2018, by David Olejnik (St. Louis Home School Patriots) against (Marshall County High School, Benton, Kentucky).

Other sports

Professional soccer

Busch Stadium hosted an exhibition soccer game on May 23, 2013, between English clubs Manchester City and Chelsea. Tickets for the match sold out within 20 minutes of going on sale, and Manchester City won 4–3 in front of a crowd of 48,263, to date the 2nd largest attendance at a sporting event at the stadium.

Later that year on November 18, Busch hosted a friendly between Bosnia and Herzegovina and Argentina; before a crowd of more than 30,000, many of which were members of St. Louis' large Bosniak community, Argentina beat Bosnia 2–0, with Sergio Agüero scoring both goals.

On April 4, 2015, the United States Women's National Soccer Team defeated New Zealand 4–0 in front of over 35,000 fans.

On November 13, 2015, the United States Men's National Soccer Team defeated St. Vincent and the Grenadines 6–1 in the first match of the fourth round of qualifiers for the 2018 FIFA World Cup in front of a crowd of 43,433.

Another international friendly was hosted at Busch in 2016: Italian side A.S. Roma, bolstered by a goal from Bosnian star Edin Džeko, defeated Liverpool F.C. 2–1.

The United States women's national team returned on May 16, 2019, for another friendly against New Zealand as part of their preparations for the 2019 FIFA Women's World Cup. The United States won 5–0 in front of 35,761 spectators.

Professional hockey
On March 9, 2016, the National Hockey League announced that the St. Louis Blues, for the first time in their 50-year history, would host an outdoor game. The 2017 NHL Winter Classic was held at Busch Stadium  on January 2, 2017. The Blues won the game by a score of 4–1 against the Chicago Blackhawks. Despite thick fog and spotty rain, Busch Stadium sold out to a crowd of 46,556 St. Louis hockey fans.

On June 12, 2019, the stadium hosted a watch party for Game 7 of the Stanley Cup Finals when the Blues beat the Boston Bruins and won their first ever Stanley Cup. The Cardinals offered the stadium for use as it was empty that evening (the Cards were at Miami for a series) and the Blues' main watch party at Enterprise Center had sold out within a minute for Game 7, with many of the $10 tickets being picked up by scalpers who sold them on secondary markets at inflated prices. More than 25,000 fans viewed the game on the main scoreboards while braving a heavy rainstorm that hit the area during the 1st period.

College football
Southern Illinois University and Southeast Missouri State played each other in the first ever football game at Busch Stadium on September 21, 2013. The announced attendance was 14,618.

Concerts

Features

Design
Whereas the previous stadium was enclosed on all sides in the "cookie-cutter" style very similar to Riverfront, Veterans, Three Rivers and Atlanta-Fulton County stadiums, the new stadium is similar to the many other Populous designed "retro-classic" fields. Like all those, it offers a panoramic view of the downtown skyline.

The Gate 3 entrance on the west side of the stadium is most iconic, with a large "bridge" resembling the Eads Bridge arching over the entrance. The exterior of the stadium contains historical plaques of Cardinals logos, the STL insignia and a Busch Stadium logo behind home plate.

After complaints from fans that not all out-of-town games could be placed on the Daktronics out-of-town scoreboard at one time, following the inaugural season a number of advertisement panels were removed to expand the scoreboard and also create a secondary video board. In 2016, the entire original scoreboard and fascia-board system was replaced, creating two full HD video boards: the main board, which took up the entire area of the original scoreboard and video board, measures 4,800 sq ft (40 ft x 120 ft), with the out-of-town scoreboard measuring 3,280 sq ft (40 x 81 ft). 2019 saw the installation of LED floodlights with light-show capabilities, as well as the construction of the Budweiser Terrace in the right field upper deck. The Terrace is a multi-level general admission standing area with two full bars, a BBQ outlet and social areas in the concourse, and a stage area for pre- and in-game entertainment.

Statues
Outside the Gate 3 entrance stands a bronze statue of Cardinals legend Stan "The Man" Musial. Other Cardinals statues that previously surrounded Busch Memorial Stadium are now displayed at the corner of Clark and 8th streets, outside the Cardinals' team store. The statues are of former Cardinal players and Hall of Fame inductees Enos Slaughter, Dizzy Dean, Rogers Hornsby, Red Schoendienst, Lou Brock, Bob Gibson, Ozzie Smith, and Ted Simmons; former St. Louis Browns player and Hall of Fame inductee George Sisler; former Negro league St. Louis Stars player and Hall of Fame inductee Cool Papa Bell; and former Cardinals radio broadcaster and Hall of Fame honoree Jack Buck.

Concessions
Fans at the stadium have access to a large amount of food and drink options, ranging from standard ballpark fare like bratwurst, nachos and peanuts to St Louis-area favorites such as pork steak sandwiches and toasted ravioli. Budweiser holds the beer contract for the stadium as one would expect, but local craft breweries such as Saint Louis Brewery, Urban Chestnut, and 4 Hands all are available at multiple outlets. Tickets for multiple all-inclusive areas are sold on a single game basis, with amenities running the gamut from the ritzy Champions Club (offering a multiple-course buffet, large screen televisions, a chance to get on television or radio as a broadcast booth is located inside the club, and a full bar) to the more family-oriented Scoreboard Patio (with table seating for four in center field and a cookout-style selection of food). Cardinal management also allows outside food and drink (including soft-sided drink coolers); as a result, it is not uncommon to see vendors selling discounted bags of peanuts and bottles of soda and water, or even scalpers including a box of Cracker Jack with tickets.

"Fredbird" store

The ballpark features a make-your-own-mascot store featuring Fredbird, the Cardinals' team mascot. Operated by St. Louis-based Build-A-Bear, the store was first located in the right-field lower deck before it was moved to center field across from Ballpark Village in 2015 to allow it to be open on non-game days.

Press accommodations
After St. Louis Post-Dispatch sportswriter Rick Hummel was honored with the BBWAA Career Excellence Award and induction into the National Baseball Hall of Fame and Museum in 2007, the Cardinals renamed the stadium's press box the "Bob Broeg-Rick Hummel Press Box", honoring the two local writers enshrined in Cooperstown.

Ballpark Village
Ballpark Village is a multi-phase residential and entertainment complex located on the site of the former Busch Memorial Stadium across the street from the new ballpark. Despite several years of delays, groundbreaking occurred in February 2013 and the first phase was completed in time for Opening Day 2014.

Other modifications
During a weather incident during a July 2006 game vs the Atlanta Braves, portable concession stands were knocked over, the infield rain tarp was damaged, and plastic sheets used to protect the press box were dislodged. As a result of the storm at least 30 spectators were injured, of whom five were taken to the hospital. After the storm happened, the stadium designated shelter areas for such disasters which are located throughout the ballpark.

Following Juan Encarnación's face injury on August 31, 2007, workers extended the screen from dugout to dugout during the 2007-2008 off season.

In 2018, the Cardinals Front Office announced that six sections of seating would be removed to make way for a new fan experience called the Budweiser Terrace, which features food, drinks, games, drink rails, and lounge style seating while providing a view of the game.

Regular season home attendance

References

External links

Official Information from MLB.com
Pre-construction Project Information from Wayback Machine

Baseball venues in St. Louis
St. Louis Cardinals stadiums
Major League Baseball venues
Sports venues in St. Louis
Sports venues completed in 2006
Baseball venues in Missouri
2006 establishments in Missouri
Ice hockey venues in Missouri
Outdoor ice hockey venues in the United States
Tourist attractions in St. Louis
Downtown St. Louis
Populous (company) buildings
Sports venues in Missouri
Anheuser-Busch advertising